The Romanian Language Day is a public holiday of Romania celebrated every 31 August for the Romanian language. It is a Romance language, being part of the same linguistic family as the French, Italian, Portuguese and Spanish languages. The holiday was first proposed in 2011, when MPs of the Romanian Parliament from all political parties submitted a request to the Senate to make 31 August the "Romanian Language Day". Earlier, in the same year, organizations and associations of Romanians in Bulgaria, Hungary, Serbia and Ukraine had already declared 31 August as such, starting to celebrate it in 2012 and asking the Romanian state to also recognize the holiday.

The Senate approved it on 6 December 2011, while the Chamber of Deputies accepted it on 19 February 2013. Romanian President Traian Băsescu promulgated the holiday on 13 March 2013, which was published in the Monitorul Oficial six days later. According to the law that accepted the holiday, Law No. 53/2013, it can be celebrated by national public authorities and foreign diplomatic missions, which may organize cultural and educational events of a scientific or "evocative" character.

A holiday celebrating the Romanian language had been enacted long before in 23 June 1990 in Moldova. It was named "Limba noastră cea română" ("Our Romanian Language"), but its name was changed in 1994 to simply "Limba noastră" ("Our Language").

The Romanian Language Day is also celebrated and recognized internationally. For example, the Romanian embassy in Madrid, Spain, congratulated on this day all Romanian-speaking persons for "preserving their national identity through their language" and announced that it supported the initiative of the Romanian Cultural Institute's (ICR) branch in Madrid to start an online campaign to pay homage to the work of Romanian literature translators to Spanish. Cultural organizations also ensure that Romanian diaspora communities can also celebrate the holiday. This has been the case in Vidin (Bulgaria), Zakarpattia (Ukraine), the Timok Valley and Vojvodina (Serbia) and Méhkerék (Hungary).

See also
 Public holidays in Romania
 Limba noastră (public holiday)

References

Romanian language
Annual events in Romania
Summer events in Romania
Observances in Romania
August observances
Language observances
Public holidays in Romania
2013 establishments in Romania